Sir Frederick Richard Saunders  (7 July 1838 – 30 March 1910) was the Treasurer of Ceylon (now Sri Lanka) (1890–1897), Commissioner of Stamps, a member of the Executive and Legislative Councils, and the second British colonial Inspector General of Police of British Ceylon from 1872 to 1873.

Frederick Richard Saunders was born in Colombo, Ceylon on 7 July 1838, the first son and second child of Frederick Saunders (1804–1870) (the Postmaster General of Ceylon (1839–1861) and then Treasurer of Ceylon (1861–1865)) and Louisa Matilda née Tucker (1814–1895).

He was educated at Guernsey College and the Royal Military Academy, Woolwich. He entered the Ceylon Civil Service in 1857, and became successively District Judge, Inspector-General of Prisons, Government Agent for the Western Province, and Auditor-General. In 1890 he was appointed Treasurer of Ceylon and Commissioner of Stamps. He received the CMG in 1880 and was appointed 
Knight Commander of the Order of St Michael and St George on 22 June 1897, retiring from public service in 1897.

Saunders was married, firstly, 26 October 1867, to Mary Jane née Gibson, who died 30 April 1895, and, secondly, in 1900, to Christina Sophia née Freshfield, widow of Captain C. F. Borrer, late 60th Rifles and daughter of Charles Freshfield (MP for Dover), who died 15 January 1909.  
Saunders died on 30 March 1910 at his property in Hove, East Sussex at age 71. He was interred at Hove Cemetery, in a plot adjoining his wife, Christina.

References

1838 births
1910 deaths
British colonial police officers
Graduates of the Royal Military Academy, Woolwich
Ceylonese Knights Commander of the Order of St Michael and St George
People from Colombo
People from British Ceylon
Sri Lankan independence movement
Sri Lankan Inspectors General of Police
Sri Lankan people of British descent
Treasurers of Ceylon
Mayors of Colombo